The 1995 St. Edmundsbury Borough Council election took place on 4 May 1995 to elect members of St Edmundsbury Borough Council in England. This was on the same day as other local elections.

Summary

|}

Ward results

Abbeygate

Barningham

Barrow

Cangle

Castle

Cavendish

Chalkstone

Chevington

Clare

Clements

Eastgate

Fornham

Great Barton

Honington

Horringer

Horringer Court

Hundon

Ixworth

Kedington

Northgate

Pakenham

Risby

Risbygate

Rougham

Sextons

Southgate

St. Mary's & Hellons

St. Olaves

Stanton

Westgate

Whelnetham

Wickhambrook

Withersfield

References

1995 English local elections
May 1995 events in the United Kingdom
1995
1990s in Suffolk